Jiǎn is a Han surname meaning "simple". It was the 382th surname listed on the Hundred Family Surnames. There are more people in Taiwan with this surname than any single province in Mainland China.

Notable people

 Jian Zi-Hao (简自豪), Uzi (League of Legends player)
 Sir Yuet-keung Kan GBE JP (Chinese: 簡悅強, 26 July 1913 – 14 September 2012), Hong Kong banker, politician and lawyer
 Jianzhi (簡之), courtesy name of Yao Silian (姚思廉; died 637), an official of the Chinese dynasties Sui Dynasty and Tang Dynasty
 Victor Kan (簡華捷, Kan Wah Chit; born 1941) Hong Kong student of the late Yip Man
  (born 25 February 1972 in Chiba) is a retired Japanese sprinter who specialized in the 400 metres
 Eugene Chien (born  February 4, 1946) is a politician and diplomat of the Republic of China on Taiwan
 Chien Yu-Hsiu (born February 29, 1980) is a male badminton player from the Republic of China.
 John Chien (簡啟聰主教, March 23, 1940 - March 5, 2013) third bishop of the Episcopal Diocese of Taiwan from 1988 to 2001
 Chien Tung-ming (born 4 June 1951) is a Taiwanese aboriginal politician. A member of the Paiwan tribe also known by the name Uliw Qaljupayare
 Jian Yi(Simplified Chinese简艺； born 1975) is a Chinese filmmaker and activist

Chinese-language surnames
Individual Chinese surnames